Okey Uzoeshi  is a musician and an actor. He is known for his roles in Two Brides and a Baby, Blood in the Lagoon, Love and War, Something Wicked and Couple of Days.

Early life and education 
He was born on April 8, 1983, in Imo State. He attended Birrel Avenue High School for his post primary education and attended Federal Polytechnic Nekede Owerri for his post secondary education

Career 
He started his career as a musician before he ventured into acting where he made his debut in a movie called Fatal Imagination. Since then, he has featured in several family and advocacy movies such as something Wicked, Strain, Couple of Days and others.

Award and nominations 
He has received nominations from the Best of Nollywood Awards (BON), Golden Icons Academy Movie Awards (GIAMA), and the African Movie Academy Awards (AMAA).

Filmography 
Fatal Imagination
Couple of Days
Life of A Nigerian Couple
Apasaye
Something Wicked
Obsession
Blood in the Lagoon 
Sweet Tomorrow
Battleground (African Magic Series) 
Blood sisters

References 

Nigerian male film actors
Male actors from Imo State
20th-century Nigerian actors
1983 births
Living people
Federal Polytechnic, Nekede alumni
Nigerian male musicians
21st-century Nigerian male actors
Nigerian male television actors
Igbo actors